Randy Mendoza (born March 21, 1996) is an American professional soccer player who currently plays as a defender for Tacoma Defiance in the USL Championship.

Early life and education 
Mendoza was raised in Santa Paula, California and attended Santa Paula High School where he played soccer. He continued his education at California State University, Los Angeles where he played for the Golden Eagles in 2014. He appeared in 21 games before transferring to the University of California, Santa Barbara. He was a student-athlete for the UC Santa Barbara Gauchos men's soccer team from 2015 to 2017.

Club career 
While in college, Mendoza played for Premier Development League clubs Ventura County Fusion and SIMA Águilas while maintaining NCAA eligibility.

Mendoza signed professional terms with Orlando City B in February 2019. He made his professional debut on March 30, 2019, against FC Tucson and was sent off in the 45th minute.

On June 12, 2019, Mendoza was part of the Orlando City senior team's traveling squad for their U.S. Open Cup Fourth Round game against USL Championship team Memphis 901. Mendoza appeared as a stoppage time substitute as Orlando won 3–1.

On February 25, 2020, Mendoza was announced as a new signing for Stumptown Athletic of the National Independent Soccer Association.

On March 15, 2021, Mendoza was announced as one of four new signings by USL Championship side Tacoma Defiance.

References

External links 
 
 Randy Mendoza at USL League Two
 Randy Mendoza at Orlando City B
 Randy Mendoza at UC Santa Barbara Gauchos
 Randy Mendoza at Cal State Los Angeles Golden Eagles

1996 births
Living people
American soccer players
Association football defenders
People from Santa Paula, California
UC Santa Barbara Gauchos men's soccer players
Ventura County Fusion players
SIMA Águilas players
Orlando City SC players
Orlando City B players
Stumptown AC players
Tacoma Defiance players
Soccer players from California
Sportspeople from Ventura County, California
USL League One players
USL League Two players
National Independent Soccer Association players
USL Championship players
MLS Next Pro players